Werner Scholem (29 December 1895 – 17 July 1940) was a member of the German Reichstag in 1924 to 1928 and a leading member of the Communist Party of Germany. Scholem and his wife, Emmy, were portrayed in the 2014 documentary "Between Utopia and Counter Revolution".

Background
Scholem was born on December 29, 1895, in a Jewish family in Berlin. His father was a print shop owner. His brother was Gershom Scholem.

In their youth Werner and Gerhard (later Gershom) were members of the Zionist youth-movement "Jung Juda". Shortly before the outbreak of the First World War, Werner joined a socialist workers' youth group. During the war, both brothers debated the conflicts and common grounds of Zionism and socialism.

From the age of 16, he was also involved in journalism. In 1917, he joined the Independent Social Democratic Party (USPD) and was temporarily detained at Roter Ochse for insulting the Emperor and anti-war activities.

In the Gershom Scholem Collection at the National Library of Israel, there is a copy of Solomon Schecter's German book on Hasidism, "Die Chassidim", published in Berlin in 1904. The book contains the signature of Werner Scholem, and at some point it came into the possession of his younger brother Gershom.

Career
In 1919, Scholem worked in Halle (Saale), as editor of the Volksblatt.

In 1920, Scholem joined the left wing of the Communist Party of Germany. In 1921, he became one of the Party's representatives to the Prussian Landtag. The same year, Scholem was entrusted with editing the party newspaper Die Rote Fahne (The Red Flag).

In subsequent years, Scholem worked in the party organisation, mostly for the Berlin branch. In 1924, he became the leader of the national organization, and consequently a member of the Political Bureau of the Communist Party. From 1924 to 1928, he was a member of the German Reichstag. He led the so-called Fischer-Maslow Group associated with the Comintern chairman Grigory Zinoviev, which formed the new "ultra-left" Communist Party leadership after the "right" wing of the party was removed in 1923 by the leaders of the time.

In August 1925, the new party leadership was sidelined. Scholem was expelled from the party in November 1926 after having cosponsored the Declaration of the 700 against the oppression of the United Left Opposition in Soviet Union. He subsequently joined the group of Left Communists in the Reichstag and, in April 1928, founded with others a "Lenin Bund". This association grew to become one of the leading splinter Communist organizations in Germany. However, Scholem left the Lenin Bund within the year, and remained unaffiliated while still sympathizing with Trotskyist positions and the Left Opposition (LO). He frequently wrote articles for their newspaper Permanente Revolution.

As a Jew and a communist, Scholem was arrested after the seizure of power by the Nazi Party in 1933, and he continued to be held in "preventative custody" until he was deported to Buchenwald in 1938. He was part of a group of former Reichstag members held at the concentration camp; their prominent status afforded them some degree of protection. However, in 1940, the SS singled out Scholem and another Jewish ex-Reichstag member, Ernst Heilmann, for execution. Heilmann was killed by injection, and Scholem was shot by Hauptscharführer Blank.

Documentary 
The life of Scholem and his wife, Emmy, is portrayed in the 2014 documentary "Between Utopia and Counter Revolution" (German: Zwischen Utopie und Gegenrevolution, with English subtitles) by Niels Bolbrinker. It features an interview with Renee Goddard talking about the arrest of her parents by the Nazis in 1933. Already in 2008, Renee Goddard was interviewed by German filmmaker Alexander Kluge, a feature that was shown in German TV under the title "Manche Toten sind nicht tot".

Literature

Monographs
 Ralf Hoffrogge: A Jewish Communist in Weimar Germany. The Life of Werner Scholem (1895 – 1940), Brill Publications 2017,  (Werner Scholem - eine politische Biographie (1895-1940), UVK Konstanz 2014). 
 Mirjam Zadoff, Der rote Hiob: Das Leben des Werner Scholem (Munich: Hanser Verlag, 2014), .

 Stephan Abarbanel, Morgenland (bases on the story of the Scholem brothers)

Articles
 Gedenkstätte Buchenwald (ed.): Buchenwald Concentration Camp 1937-1945: A Guide to the Permanent Historical Exhibition, Wallstein Verlag 2004, p. 66–67, p. 119.
 Michael Buckmiller und Pascal Nafe: Die Naherwartung des Kommunismus – Werner Scholem. In: Judentum und politische Existenz. Offizin-Verlag, Hannover 2000, p. 61–82.
 Ralf Hoffrogge: Utopien am Abgrund. Der Briefwechsel Werner Scholem – Gershom Scholem in den Jahren 1914-1919. In: Schreiben im Krieg – Schreiben vom Krieg. Feldpost im Zeitalter der Weltkriege, Klartext-Verlag, Essen 2011, p. 429-440, .
 Ralf Hoffrogge: Emmy und Werner Scholem im Kampf zwischen Utopie und Gegenrevolution, in: Hannoversche Geschichtsblätter, Neue Folge Band 65 (2011), S. 157-176.
 Hermann Weber und Andreas Herbst: Deutsche Kommunisten. Biographisches Handbuch 1918 bis 1945. Karl Dietz Verlag, 2nd edition Berlin 2008, p. 692–694, 
 Mirjam Zadoff: Unter Brüdern – Gershom und Werner Scholem. Von den Utopien der Jugend zum jüdischen Alltag zwischen den Kriegen. In: Münchner Beiträge zur jüdischen Geschichte und Kultur. Band 1, Heft 2, 2007, p. 56–66.
 Zvi Leshem, Werner Scholem, Gershom Scholem, Communism and Hasidism : Mystery of a Book, on the National Library of Israel Blog (Hebrew)

References

External links
 Between Utopia and Counter Revolution, 17-minute documentary by Niels Bolbrinker, German with English subtitles, Germany 2014.

1895 births
1940 deaths
Politicians from Berlin
German Jews who died in the Holocaust
German communists
Jewish German politicians
Jewish socialists
Communist Party of Germany politicians
German people who died in Buchenwald concentration camp
Politicians who died in Nazi concentration camps
German civilians killed in World War II
Members of the Reichstag of the Weimar Republic
People from Berlin executed in Nazi concentration camps
Executed German people
People executed by Germany by firearm